Abnormal uterine bleeding (AUB), also known as (AVB) or as atypical vaginal bleeding, is vaginal bleeding from the uterus that is abnormally frequent, lasts excessively long, is heavier than normal, or is irregular. The term dysfunctional uterine bleeding was used when no underlying cause was present. Vaginal bleeding during pregnancy is excluded. Iron deficiency anemia may occur and quality of life may be negatively affected.

The underlying causes may include ovulation problems, fibroids, the lining of the uterus growing into the uterine wall, uterine polyps, underlying bleeding problems, side effects from birth control, or cancer. More than one category of causes may apply in an individual case. The first step in work-up is to rule out a tumor or pregnancy. Medical imaging or hysteroscopy may help with the diagnosis.

Treatment depends on the underlying cause. Options may include hormonal birth control, gonadotropin-releasing hormone (GnRH) agonists, tranexamic acid, NSAIDs, and surgery such as endometrial ablation or hysterectomy. Over the course of a year, roughly 20% of reproductive-aged women self-report at least one symptom of AUB.

Signs and symptoms
Symptoms include vaginal bleeding that occurs irregularly, at abnormal frequency, lasts excessively long, or is more than normal. Normal frequency of periods is 22 to 38 days. Variation in the length of time between cycles is typically less than 21 days. Bleeding typically last less than nine days and blood loss is less than 80 mL. Excessive blood loss may also be defined as that which negatively affects a person's quality of life. Bleeding more than six months after menopause is also a concern.

Causes
The causes of AUB are divided into nine groups: uterine polyps, fibroids, adenomyosis, cancer, blood clotting disorders, problems with ovulation, endometrial problems, healthcare induced, and not yet classified. More than one category of causes may apply in an individual case. Healthcare induced causes may include side effects of birth control.

Mechanism
The underlying mechanism is often a hormonal disturbance: reduced levels of progesterone cause high levels of prostaglandin F2-alpha and cause abnormally heavy flow as progesterone stabilizes the endometrium and inhibits synthesis of prostaglandin F2-alpha; increased levels of tissue plasminogen activator (t-PA), a fibrinolytic enzyme, lead to more fibrinolysis.

Ovulatory 
Ten percent of cases occur in women who are ovulating, but progesterone secretion is prolonged because estrogen levels are low. This causes irregular shedding of the uterine lining and break-through bleeding. Some evidence has associated ovulatory DUB with more fragile blood vessels in the uterus. It may represent a possible endocrine dysfunction, resulting in menorrhagia or metrorrhagia. Mid-cycle bleeding may indicate a transient estrogen decline, while late-cycle bleeding may indicate progesterone deficiency.

Anovulatory 

About 90% of DUB events occur when ovulation is not occurring (anovulatory DUB). Anovulatory menstrual cycles are common at the extremes of reproductive age, such as early puberty and perimenopause (period around menopause). In such cases, women do not properly develop and release a mature egg. When this happens, the corpus luteum, which is a mound of tissue that produces progesterone, does not form. As a result, estrogen is produced continuously, causing an overgrowth of the uterus lining. The period is delayed in such cases, and when it occurs menstruation can be very heavy and prolonged. Sometimes anovulatory DUB is due to a delay in the full maturation of the reproductive system in teenagers. Usually, however, the mechanisms are unknown.

The cause can be psychological stress, weight (obesity, anorexia, or a rapid change), exercise, endocrinopathy, neoplasm, drugs, or it may be otherwise unknown.

Diagnosis
Diagnosis of AUB starts with a medical history and physical examination. Normal menstrual bleeding patterns vary from woman to woman, so the medical history covers specific details about the woman's individual menstrual bleeding pattern, such as its predictability, length, volume, and whether she experiences cramps or other pain. The healthcare provider will also check to see whether she or any family members have any potentially related health conditions, and whether she is taking medication that might increase or decrease menstrual bleeding, such as herbal supplements, hormonal contraceptives, over-the-counter drugs such as aspirin, or blood thinners.

Medical tests include a blood test, to see whether the abnormal bleeding has caused anemia, and a pelvic ultrasound, to see whether the abnormal bleeding is caused by a structural problem, such as a uterine fibroid. Ultrasound is specifically recommended in those over the age of 35 or those in whom bleeding continues despite initial treatment. Laboratory assessment of thyroid stimulating hormone (TSH), pregnancy, and chlamydia is also recommended.

More extensive testing might include an MRI and endometrial sampling. Endometrial sampling is recommended in those over the age of 45 who do not improve with treatment and in those with intermenstrual bleeding that persists. The PALM-COEIN system may be used to classify the uterine bleeding.

Management 
Treatment depends on the underlying cause. Options may include hormonal birth control, gonadotropin-releasing hormone (GnRH) agonists, tranexamic acid, NSAIDs, and surgery such as endometrial ablation or hysterectomy. Polyps, adenomyosis, and cancer are generally treated by surgery. Iron supplementation may be needed. Dysfunctional Uterine Bleeding symptoms like mid cycle bleeding, late cycle bleeding and irregular periods were taken care off by Ovoutoline Forte tablet a marketed herbal formulation of Emami Limited, in Dysfunctional Uterine Bleeding (DUB).

Terminology
The terminology "dysfunctional uterine bleeding" is no longer recommended. Historically dysfunctional uterine bleeding meant there was no structural or systemic problems present. In AUB underlying causes may be present.

Epidemiology
About one-third of all medical appointments with gynecologists involve AUB, with the proportion rising to 70% in the years around menopause.

References

External links 
 Merck Manual Abnormal Uterine Bleeding

Noninflammatory disorders of female genital tract
Wikipedia medicine articles ready to translate